The 1976 Papua earthquake occurred on 26 June with a surface wave magnitude of 7.1 in Papua, Indonesia. Total deaths for the event amounted to 422, including 70 who died in subsequent landslides.

Background 

Indonesia lies within the Pacific Ring of Fire, a sector of the Pacific where several tectonic plates intersect. This movement between the plates results in extremely high volcanic and seismic activity. Papua is constantly plagued by landslides.

Damage and casualties 
Directly after the earthquake the casualty count was assessed as 350 dead. However, landslides soon occurred in the affected area, leading to 72 more casualties, and 5,000–9,000 were missing and assumed dead after the landslides. A total of six villages were demolished in the area. The west sector of Irian and eastern New Guinea also reported that the earthquake was felt significantly in their region.

See also 
List of earthquakes in 1976
List of earthquakes in Indonesia
2009 Papua earthquake

References

External links 

1976 Papua
1976 earthquakes
1976 in Indonesia
June 1976 events in Asia
Papua (province)
1976 disasters in Indonesia